Bebek may refer to:

Places
Bebek, Istanbul, a historic neighborhood of Istanbul, Turkey
Bebek Bay, a resort area on the Bosporus in Istanbul, Turkey
Bebek, Aksaray, a village in the District of Aksaray, Aksaray Province, Turkey
Bebek, Adıyaman, a village in the District of Adıyaman, Adıyaman Province, Turkey

Other uses
Bebek (surname), a Croatian surname
Bebek (family) ancient Hungarian noble family
Bebek (album), a 2001 album by İzel